Shoaib Mir Memon is a retired Pakistani civil servant who served in BPS-22 grade as the Education Secretary of Pakistan and Chief Secretary Balochistan. Hailing from Sindh, he has also served as chairman of State Life and Additional Secretary Establishment Division.

Memon attained a degree of MBBS and is also a Certified Director from Pakistan Institute of Corporate Governance.

Career
Memon has held various key positions throughout his career with the most notable of his assignments being Chief Secretary Balochistan and Education Secretary of Pakistan. He has also served as chairman of State Life Insurance Corporation of Pakistan. Other positions where he has served include Additional Secretary Establishment Division and as Principal Secretary to Governor of Balochistan.

Memon belongs to the 15th CTP and is batchmates with Maroof Afzal, Iqbal Hussain Durrani, Rizwan Ahmed, Fawad Hassan Fawad and Allah Dino Khawaja. After retirement from active civil service, Memon was made member of the prestigious Federal Public Service Commission.

References

See also
 Government of Pakistan
 Pakistan Administrative Service

Year of birth missing (living people)
Living people
Pakistani civil servants
Government of Pakistan
Pakistani government officials